The Holiday is a 2006 romantic comedy film written, produced and directed by Nancy Meyers. Coproduced by Bruce A. Block, it was filmed in both California and England and stars Kate Winslet and Cameron Diaz as Iris and Amanda, two lovelorn women from opposite sides of the Atlantic Ocean, who arrange a home exchange to escape heartbreak during the Christmas and holiday season. Jude Law and Jack Black were cast as the film's leading men Graham and Miles, with Eli Wallach, Shannyn Sossamon, Edward Burns, and Rufus Sewell playing key supporting roles.

The Holiday premiered in New York City on November 29, 2006, before it was theatrically released in the United Kingdom and United States on December 8, 2006. The film was distributed by Columbia Pictures in North America and by Universal Pictures overseas. It grossed over $205 million worldwide against a budget of $85 million. The film received mixed reviews, with critics praising its visual design and the cast's performances, though regarded the plot as predictable.

Plot 
Iris Simpkins, a society columnist for the Daily Telegraph in London, is still madly in love with her ex-boyfriend, Jasper Bloom, despite the fact that he cheated on her and is emotionally needy. Devastated to discover he is engaged, she decides to get away for the holidays.

Amanda Woods, a movie trailer producer in Los Angeles, breaks up with her film composer boyfriend, Ethan, after he admits to cheating on her. Coming across Iris's listing of her cottage on a home swap website, she messages her. They agree to switch houses for two weeks starting the next day.

Iris happily settles into Amanda's large house, but Amanda decides she has made a mistake and plans to return home the next day. That night, Iris's handsome book editor brother, Graham, drops by after drinking too much at the local pub, asking to spend the night. Amanda agrees, and after they talk, Graham unexpectedly kisses her on the lips; she suggests they have sex because she does not expect to see him ever again. The next morning, despite having enjoyed their time together, they go their separate ways. That evening, Graham meets friends at the pub for dinner, as he had mentioned to Amanda, and he sees Amanda there, who has decided to stay.

Iris meets Arthur Abbott, Amanda's elderly neighbor and an Oscar-winning screenwriter from the Golden Age of Film. Over dinner, Iris tells him about her troubles with Jasper. He gives her a long list of movies with strong female characters to watch so she can become "the leading lady of her own life."

Iris persuades Arthur to be the keynote speaker at a Writers Guild of America West gala and exercises with him so he can walk onstage without his walker. She also befriends Miles, a colleague of Ethan's who is dating aspiring actress Maggie. While at the video store looking for one of the movies on Arthur's list, he catches Maggie with another man. Iris explains her troubles with Jasper, and they have dinner together to bring each other's spirits up on Christmas Eve.

Amanda opens up to Graham, telling him she has not cried since her parents divorced when she was 15. Surprising him at his house, she discovers he is a widower with two young daughters. He kept his daughters a secret because compartmentalizing his life helps him deal with the overwhelming responsibility of being a single working father, and he does not want to bring a woman into the girls' lives unless the relationship definitely has a future. They begin to think their relationship is more complicated than they can handle.

On the day of the screenwriter's gala, Maggie asks Miles to take her back, but he refuses. Jasper surprises Iris by showing up at Amanda's, but drawing on the example of the women from Arthur's films, she kicks him out. At the gala, Arthur walks onstage unassisted, and Miles asks Iris out on a date for New Year's Eve. She agrees and kisses him.

Meanwhile, Graham tells Amanda he has fallen for her, and while she says she does not return the sentiment, they agree to try to make a long-distance relationship work. While heading to the airport, Amanda breaks down crying. She runs back to the cottage and she and Graham make plans to spend New Year's Eve together with his daughters.

On New Year's Eve, Iris, Amanda, Miles, and Graham, with his daughters, all happily celebrate at Graham's house.

Cast 

 Kate Winslet as Iris Simpkins:  Iris is a society columnist, writing for the Daily Telegraph. Winslet was handpicked by Meyers, who wrote all of Iris's lines with Winslet in mind. The character was named Iris after Jude Law's young daughter. A fan of Meyers' previous work on Something's Gotta Give (2003), Winslet, then primarily known for her portrayals in period films, "loved the idea" of playing a contemporary English woman in a romantic comedy, a genre she had not done before. Winslet said she had initially felt "nervous and ... scared about trying to be funny" at times, stating that "Jude [Law] and I would speak on the telephone a lot before we started shooting, 'Oh my god, they're going to fire us, they're going to recast, what if we don't make them laugh?" In preparing for her role, Winslet watched screwball comedies from the 1940s, such as His Girl Friday and The Philadelphia Story, to study the dialogues and performances.
Cameron Diaz as Amanda Woods:  Amanda is the owner of a successful business that produces movie trailers. A fan of Meyers' work, Diaz signed on after reading parts of the script. Commenting on her decision to play Amanda, Diaz said that her character "was totally relatable to because we've all had these relationships that fail. But I loved the bravery that she displays. She ... learns about who she is and opens herself up to possibilities she's never allowed herself to have before. I felt that was such a wonderful message to put out there." Meyers, who envisioned casting her still during the writing process, compared Diaz's performance in the film to Goldie Hawn's, complimenting her adeptness at physical comedy: "It's really hard I think to be that cute and sexy and that funny and that sort of girl-friendly ... She seemed absolutely the right choice for a California girl," she commented. In developing her character, Diaz also improvised on set: "There were a few scenes that were written on the page but then Nancy and I fooled around with them a bit. We didn’t want to take it [the comedy] too broad. We wanted it to be believable, so we included realistic moments," she said.
 Jude Law as Graham Simpkins:  Graham is Iris's brother, a book editor, "countryside widower", and single father raising his two daughters (Miffy Englefield as Sophie, and Emma Pritchard as Olivia) by himself after his wife's death. Law accepted the role as he was interested in playing a type of character that he had never played on film before. After his appearances in a string of period dramas and science fiction films in the early to mid-2000s, Law found it tricky to approach the contemporary role of Graham. Like Winslet, the actor stated, he felt more vulnerable about playing a character who fitted his own look and did not require an accent, a costume or a relocation. Meyers, who was not immediately sure if Law was going to fit into the genre and whose character evolved more during the writing than the others, decided to cast him after a meeting in which they went through the script together. In preparing for his role, Meyers sent him a collection of Clark Gable movies to prepare the performance that she wanted in The Holiday.
 Jack Black as Miles Dumont:  Miles is a Hollywood film composer working with Amanda and an affiliate of her boyfriend, Ethan. As with Diaz and Winslet, Meyers specially created the character for Black after watching his performance in the musical comedy film School of Rock (2003). On his cast, Meyers commented that "when I was thinking of this movie I thought he was someone I would like to write a part for and I'm aware he's not Clark Gable, he's not tall dark and handsome, but he's adorable, he's lovable. It's my way of saying this is the right kind of guy, this is what most guys look like if they're lucky, he's so adorable, and why not?" Cast against type, Black felt "flattered [and] a little bit nervous" about Meyers' approach to star in a rom-com, though he eventually agreed to sign on upon learning that he would play opposite Winslet. While he felt it was difficult to find the adorable side in his role, Black appreciated Miles' relationship with music, stating, "I could relate to that Miles was a film composer and I just got done composing my music for my score. So I knew about that world."
 Eli Wallach as Arthur Abbott:  Arthur is Amanda's neighbor, a famous screenwriter from the Golden Age of Hollywood whom Iris befriends. Wallach was 90 years old when The Holiday was filmed. Meyers found him so animated and energetic on the set that she had to remind him several times during filming to slow down, move more slowly, and act more like an older man.

The film reunited Rufus Sewell and Shannyn Sossamon as they both starred in A Knight's Tale (2001) together, although they do not share a scene. The film also cast Bill Macy as Ernie and Shelley Berman as Norman, friends of Arthur, as well as Kathryn Hahn as Bristol and John Krasinski as Ben, Amanda's employees. Jon Prescott appears as Maggie's short-time affair.

Dustin Hoffman appears in the video rental store in an uncredited cameo as Jack Black talks about the score from The Graduate (1967). According to Hoffman, this was unscripted and unexpected. He was going to Blockbuster for a movie, saw all the light and came over to see what was going on. He knew director Nancy Meyers, who scripted a short scene with him in it.

Lindsay Lohan, who had made her motion picture debut in Meyers's remake of The Parent Trap (1998), and James Franco, a friend of Meyers, make uncredited appearances in the trailer of the fictional movie Deception, which Amanda and her team finish at the beginning of The Holiday. Veteran voice-over talent Hal Douglas was the narrator for the trailer, as well as other "trailers" that describe Amanda's situation at various points in the film.

Production 

Production on The Holiday began in Los Angeles, then moved to England for a month before completing filming back in California. Principal photography began in the Brentwood area on the Westside of Los Angeles, where real Santa Ana winds reportedly gave Meyers and her team a winter day as warm as scripted in the screenplay. Although Amanda's home is set in Brentwood, the exterior scenes at the gated property were actually filmed in front of Southern California architect Wallace Neff's Mission Revival house in San Marino, a suburb adjacent to Pasadena. Neff had built the house for his family in 1928. The interiors of Amanda's house were filmed at Sony Pictures Studios in Culver City. Other Los Angeles locations included Arthur's house in Brentwood and Miles's house, designed by Richard Neutra, which is situated on Neutra Place in L.A.'s Silver Lake area, near downtown.

The UK part of the film was partially shot in Godalming and Shere, a town and village in the county of Surrey in South East England that dates back to the 11th century. The cottage's exterior was constructed in a field adjacent to St James's Church in Shere. The production team had sourced a genuine cottage but it was located a considerable distance from London, where the crew were based, so they opted to construct one for the purposes of filming.  Filming began January 4, 2006 and concluded on June 15, 2006. Charles Shyer directed Lohan and Franco's scenes for the fictional movie trailer made by Diaz's character.

Reception

Box office 
The film opened at number three on the United States box office, raking in $12,778,913 in the weekend of December 8, 2006. Altogether, The Holiday made $63 million at the North American domestic box office, and $142 million at the international box office. The film grossed a total of $205,841,885, worldwide, against a production budget of $85 million, and an estimated advertising spend of $34 million. The Holiday became the twelfth highest-grossing film of the 2000s to be helmed by a female director.

Critical response 
The Holiday received mixed reviews from critics. The site's consensus states "While it's certainly sweet and even somewhat touching, The Holiday is so thoroughly predictable that audiences may end up opting for an early check-out time." On Metacritic it has a score of 52 based on reviews from 31 critics, indicating "mixed or average reviews". 
Audiences polled by CinemaScore gave it a grade A−.

In her review for USA Today, Claudia Puig found that The Holiday "is a rare chick flick/romantic comedy that, despite its overt sentimentality and fairy-tale premise, doesn't feel cloyingly sweet." She felt that "much of the credit goes to inspired casting and the actors' chemistry." Carina Chocano, writing for the Los Angeles Times noted that "like a magic trick in reverse, The Holiday reveals the mechanics of the formula while trying to keep up the illusion." She complimented Winslet and Law's performances, but was critical toward Diaz, who she felt "strikes the off-note, but then you tend to think it's not her fault." Rex Reed from The New York Observer noted that "at least 90% of The Holiday is a stocking-stuffer from Tiffany's ... so loaded with charm that it makes you glow all over and puts a smile in your heart." While he felt that the final 15 minutes of film "diminish a lot of the film's good intentions," he added that Meyers "created some hearth-cozy situations, written some movie-parody zingers, and provided Eli Wallach with his best role in years."

Somewhat less enthusiastic, Owen Gleiberman of Entertainment Weekly graded the film with a B− rating, summing it as a "cookie-cutter chick flick." He concluded that "it's a self-consciously old-fashioned premise, with too much sub-Bridget Jones dithering, but Nancy Meyers' dialogue has a perky synthetic sheen." Justin Chang from Variety wrote that while "Meyers' characters tend to be more thoughtful and self-aware (or at least more self-conscious) than most ... this overlong film isn't nearly as smart as it would like to appear, and it willingly succumbs to the very rom-com cliches it pretends to subvert." He added, that "in a spirited cast ... the Brits easily outshine their Yank counterparts. Winslet weeps and moans without sacrificing her radiance or sympathy, while the marginally less teary-eyed Law effortlessly piles on the charm in a role that will have some amusing resonances for tabloid readers." Ruthe Stein of the San Francisco Chronicle remarked that the film was "the most love-centric movie since Love Actually." She felt that The Holiday "has charming moments and a hopeful message for despondent singles, but it lacks the emotional resonance of Meyers' Something's Gotta Give (2003) and the zaniness of What Women Want (2000). Clocking in at 2 hours and 16 minutes, Holiday is ridiculously long for a romantic comedy and would benefit from losing at least a half-hour."

Since its release, The Holiday has been called a modern Christmas classic, gaining considerable revived interest from audiences, thanks in part to its availability on streaming services, as well as respectively picking up steam on social media. All of this has led to viewers and critics alike revisiting their opinions of the film, with many believing it to be essential viewing and one of the best holiday films of the 2000s.

Accolades

Soundtrack 

The official soundtrack contains music by various artists, Heitor Pereira and Hans Zimmer and was released on the Varèse Sarabande label.

 "Maestro" by Hans Zimmer - 3:53
 "Iris and Jasper" by Hans Zimmer and Lorne Balfe - 3:24
 "Kayak for One" by Ryeland Allison - 1:30
 "Zero" by Hans Zimmer and Atli Örvarsson - 2:44
 "Dream Kitchen" by Hans Zimmer and Henry Jackman - 1:35
 "Separate Vacations" by Hans Zimmer, Lorne Balfe and Imogen Heap - 1:47
 "Anything Can Happen" by Hans Zimmer and Heitor Pereira - 0:48
 "Light My Fire" by Hans Zimmer - 1:14
 "Definitely Unexpected" by Hans Zimmer and Lorne Balfe - 3:34
 "If I Wanted To Call You" by Hans Zimmer and Atli Örvarsson - 1:50
 "Roadside Rhapsody" by Hans Zimmer and Henry Jackman - 1:39
 "Busy Guy" by Hans Zimmer and Henry Jackman - 1:28
 "For Nancy" by Hans Zimmer, Atli Orvarsson and Lorne Balfe - 1:27
 "It's Complicated" by Hans Zimmer and Imogen Heap - 1:00
 "Kiss Goodbye" by Heitor Pereira and Herb Alpert - 2:33
 "Verso E Prosa" by Heitor Pereira - 1:59
 "Meu Passado" by Hans Zimmer, Henry Jackman and Lorne Balfe - 1:25
 "The 'Cowch'" by Hans Zimmer, Heitor Pereira, Lorne Balfe and Imogen Heap - 2:42
 "Three Musketeers" by Hans Zimmer, Heitor Pereira, Lorne Balfe and Imogen Heap - 2:44
 "Christmas Surprise" by Hans Zimmer and Lorne Balfe - 2:32
 "Gumption" by Hans Zimmer, Atli Orvarsson and Henry Jackman - 3:45
 "Cry" by Hans Zimmer, Lorne Balfe and Heitor Pereira - 2:39
 "It's a Shame" by the Spinners
 "You Send Me" by Aretha Franklin

 In the video rental store, Miles (Jack Black) sings the theme tune of Driving Miss Daisy by "Hans". Hans Zimmer also composed and produced the score for The Holiday. Jack Black later spoofed the movie in Be Kind Rewind.
 According to a radio interview on BBC Radio 1, the song "Kill the Director" by The Wombats was written about this film. From the lyrics "this is no Bridget Jones" and according to the radio interview, they hated the film, and hence decided to write a song about it.
 The bar scene where Graham (Jude Law) enters looking for Amanda (Cameron Diaz), features "Let Go" by Frou Frou.

Sequel
In December 2022, it was rumored that a sequel to The Holiday was in preproduction, with Cameron Diaz, Jude Law, Kate Winslet and Jack Black all signing on to reprise their roles from the original. However Meyers and Winslet both denied the rumor.

See also 
 Tara Road
 Meet cute
 List of Christmas films
 List of films featuring fictional films

References

External links 

 
 
 

2000s Christmas comedy films
2006 films
2006 romantic comedy films
American romantic comedy films
British Christmas comedy films
2000s American films
2000s British films
2000s English-language films
American Christmas comedy films
Films about old age
Films about filmmaking
Films about widowhood
Films set in Los Angeles
Films set in Surrey
Films shot in Los Angeles
Films shot in England
Films about vacationing
Films scored by Hans Zimmer
Films with screenplays by Nancy Meyers
Films directed by Nancy Meyers
Columbia Pictures films
Universal Pictures films
Relativity Media films